This article contains a list of prime ministers of Saint Vincent and the Grenadines.

Chief ministers of Saint Vincent (1960–1969)

Premiers of Saint Vincent (1969–1979)

Prime ministers of Saint Vincent and the Grenadines (1979–present)

References

See also
Governor-General of Saint Vincent and the Grenadines

Saint Vincent and the Grenadines, Prime Ministers
Politics of Saint Vincent and the Grenadines
 
Prime Minister
1979 establishments in Saint Vincent and the Grenadines
Prime ministers